Albert James Lothian (1895–1952) was an architect, first half of the 20th century.  He was born in Edinburgh, Scotland, in 1895 and died in Cuernavaca, Mexico, on December 14, 1952.

He served during World War I as a motorcycle dispatch rider for the Canadian Army.

After the war, he spent about 14 years in Windsor, Ontario, Canada, as a practising architect.  His architectural style has left a mark on Windsor, with most of its prominent art deco building having been designed by Lothian. He designed St. Bernard's School in the Ford City section of Windsor, St. Clare's R.C. Church (now St. Peter's Maronite Church), The Gothic Revival School Building on the Campus of the University of Windsor, as well as dozens of homes and apartment buildings throughout the city of Windsor, Ontario, and Grosse Pointe, Michigan, United States. In August 2015, the neon sign that he designed in 1928 attached to the Lazares building in downtown Windsor received a Heritage listing along with the building which is already listed in the registry on Ouellette Avenue.

During the Great Depression he set sail with his family on his yacht, and took up residence in Nassau, Bahamas. In Nassau he continued his architectural practice, and there he designed several churches.

In his later years, he was splitting his time as an architect, working in both Nassau and the Mexican city of Cuernavaca, Morelos. According to his obituary, he was in the middle of two large development projects in Cuernavaca at the time of his death in 1952.

1895 births
1952 deaths
Canadian architects
Art Deco architects
British emigrants to Canada